James Howden (1832–1913) was a Scottish engineer

James or Jim Howden may also refer to:

 James H. Howden (1860–1938), Canadian politician
 James Howden (rugby union) (1900–1978), New Zealand rugby union player
 Jim Howden (golfer) (1878–1921), Australian golfer
 Jim Howden (rower) (1934–1993), Australian rower